A wynd is a narrow lane between houses.

Wynd or WYND may refer to:
WYND (AM), a radio station (1310 AM) licensed to serve DeLand, Florida, United States
WYND-FM, a radio station (95.5 FM) licensed to serve Silver Springs, Florida
WKHC, a radio station (97.1 FM) licensed to serve Hatteras, North Carolina, United States, which held the call sign WYND-FM from 1989 to 2000 and from 2003 to 2019

People with the name 
 Donna Wynd (born 1961), cyclist from New Zealand
 Garrey Wynd (born 1946), Australian rules footballer who played with Melbourne
 Jim Wynd (born 1964), Australian rules footballer who played with Fitzroy
 Oswald Wynd (1913–1998), Scottish writer
 Paul Wynd (born 1976), Australian rules footballer who played with North Melbourne
 Phil Wynd (born 1946), Australian rules footballer who played with Hawthorn
 Ray Wynd (1921–2003), Australian rules footballer who played with North Melbourne
 Scott Wynd (born 1970), Australian rules footballer who played with Footscray
 Viktor Wynd, artist and author

See also 
 Wynde